The 28th Intergovernmental Authority on Development Extra ordinary summit was held on 13 September 2016 in Mogadishu, Somalia. This was a historic event for Somalia as it has not hosted a high level summit in over 30 years. The key focus of the meeting was to determine the security situation in Somalia with respect to its scheduled parliamentary election. The lower-house election of Somalia is scheduled to take place on 30 October 2016.

Participants 

The Summit was also attended by representatives of other foreign trade blocs. Representatives from the United Nations, African Union, Arab League and European Union graced their presence.

References 

2016 in Somalia